Stephanie Price (born 1953) is a retired British rower who competed for Great Britain.

Rowing career
Price was part of the coxed quad scull that finished 10th overall and fourth in the B final at the 1977 World Rowing Championships in Amsterdam.

She later competed at the 1979 World Rowing Championships and 1985 World Rowing Championships.

References

Living people
1953 births
British female rowers